Bilche-Zolote ( Bil'che Zolote;) is a Ukrainian village located within the Chortkiv Raion (district) of the Ternopil Oblast (province), about  driving distance southwest of Kyiv. It hosts the administration of Bilche-Zolote settlement hromada, one of the hromadas of Ukraine. This rural community is located in a small valley adjacent to the Seret River, which is surrounded by plateaus covered with farms, broken by occasional stands of mixed forest. Bilche-Zolote is also the location of the large gypsum karst Verteba Cave, as well as a significant Neolithic Cucuteni-Trypillian culture archaeological site, and attracts tourist and spelunker visitors from many countries.

History
Founded in the early 10th century, Bilche-Zolote has been ruled at various times by the Kievan Rus', Lithuania, Austria, Russia, Poland, the Soviet Union, Germany, Carpatho-Ukraine, and Ukraine. Its town council, which oversees the governance of the area, also administers the villages of Yuryampil, Monastyrok, and Mushkativ. The town includes public elementary through secondary schools, a public library, two recreational facilities, and an Inter-Regional Rehabilitation Hospital.

Until 18 July 2020, Bilche-Zolote belonged to Borshchiv Raion. The raion was abolished in July 2020 as part of the administrative reform of Ukraine, which reduced the number of raions of Ternopil Oblast to three. The area of Borshchiv Raion was merged into Chortkiv Raion.

Bilche-Zolote Landscape Park
Founded in the early 19th century, the Bilche-Zolote Landscape Park included part of the estate and the palace of a local aristocrat family.

On 29 January 1960, the Ukraine Council of Ministers passed a resolution to include the Bilche-Zolote Landscape Park within the Ukrainian Natural Reserve Fund.

Verteba and Priest's Grotto Caves
The Verteba Cave located on the outskirts of Bilche-Zolote village gets its name from the Ukrainian word for "crib" (vertel). It consists of maze-like passageways, often separated by thin walls, as well as broad galleries. The walls of the cave are smooth and dark, with rare incrustations of calcium carbonate appearing. There are also small stalactites, and unusual stalagmites that have the appearance of barrels, all of which are coated in an opaque watery liquid known as moonmilk.

Cucuteni-Trypillian settlement
During a mundane excavation on the Sapyehy estate in 1884, workers stumbled upon the buried ruins of a prehistoric settlement near the mouth of the Verteba cave. Over the years, more than 300 intact ceramic containers have been unearthed from the floor of the cave and this Neolithic era settlement, which encompasses a total of 8 hectares (20 acres). Archaeologists identified the artifacts as belonging to the Cucuteni-Trypillian culture, with evidence of two separate periods of settlement activity dating from 4440-4100 B.C. and 3800-3300 B.C. The members of this society plowed their farms, raised livestock, hunted and fished, created textiles, and developed a beautiful and highly refined style of pottery with very intricate designs. Their settlements, which with up to 15,000 inhabitants were among the largest on earth at the time, were built in oval or circular layouts, with concentric rows of houses that were interconnected to form rings around the center of the community, where often a sanctuary building would be found. They left behind a large number of clay figurines, many of which are regarded as Mother goddess fetishes. For over 2500 years the culture flourished with no evidence left behind that would indicate they experienced warfare.  However, at the beginning of the Bronze Age their culture disappeared, the reasons for which are still debated, but possibly as a result of invaders coming from the Steppes to the east.

Over the years there have been a number of major archaeological explorations of this site, starting with excavations from 1889-1891 by Edward Pawłowicz and Gotfryd Ossowski. In 1898 Włodzimierz Demetrykiewicz conducted an excavation and analysis. In 1952 and 1956 V. N. Eravets, I. E. Svyshnikov, and G. M. Vlasova resumed the exploration of the site, which had been neglected during the turbulent first half of the 20th century. Recently, in 2000, M. Sohatskyy conducted further excavations of the site. The evidence from the discoveries revealed that there had been a gap between when the settlement was occupied. The more recent settlement yielded ceramic finds that connected it to the Shypynetsk group, a sub-group of the Cucuteni-Trypillian culture that flourished in this region during the later Neolithic.

Along with the intact ceramic containers unearthed in the cave, archaeologists have also found more than 35,000 clay fragments, including many of the famous Cucuteni-Trypillian goddess figurines, 200 pieces of bone and antler remains, and an additional 300 tools and other objects crafted from bone and stone, including flint implements, bone awls, and a few small copper artifacts. Perhaps most importantly, archaeologists discovered one of the few burial sites of the Cucuteni-Trypillian culture at this site, amounting to almost 120 individuals. One of the most famous artifacts from the Cucuteni-Trypillian culture was found at Bilche-Zolote by the first team of archaeologists in the 1890s: a bone plate from about 3500 B.C. was found inside the Verteba cave, which was incised with a beautiful silhouette of a Mother goddess, and which became one of the most recognized symbols of this culture.

Beginning in 1907, a collection of the archaeological finds from the Bilche-Zolote Cucuteni-Trypillian settlement made up the core collection of the local archaeological museum, which was housed in the palace located on the grounds of the Landscape Park. During the period of Polish occupation, these materials were removed to the Museum of Archeology in Krakow. More recent finds from archaeological excavations have been housed in the Lviv Historical Museum and the Borshchiv Regional Museum of Local Lore.

See also
Neolithic Europe
Chalcolithic Europe
Prehistory of Southeastern Europe
History of Ukraine
The Holocaust in Ukraine
 

Related articles appearing in the Ukrainian language Wikipedia for which no English Wikipedia article exists: 
Verteba Cave
Borshchiv Oblast Museum which houses some of the archaeological finds from this area.
Bilche-Zolote Trypillian culture

References

External links

Christos Nicola's Home Page - includes biographical information about Christos Nicola, and links to videos and information about the story of the survivors who hid in these caves during the Holocaust.
The Trypillia-USA-Project The Trypillian Civilization Society homepage (in English).
The Institute of Archaeomythology The homepage for The Institute of Archaeomythology, an international organization of scholars dedicated to fostering an interdisciplinary approach to cultural research with particular emphasis on the beliefs, rituals, social structure and symbolism of ancient societies. Much of their focus covers topics that relate to the Cucuteni-Trypillian Culture (in English).
Trypillian Culture from Ukraine A page from the UK-based group "Arattagar" about Trypillian Culture, which has many great photographs of the group's trip to the Trypillian Museum in Trypillia, Ukraine (in English).
Bilche Zolote weather page (in English)
Трипільська культура в Україні з колекції "Платар" Ukrainian language page about the Ukrainian Platar Collection of Trypillian Culture.
"Вертеба" - пристановище Tрипільців ("Verteba" - Trypillian refuge) by Mikola Shot, appearing in: Урядовий кур'єр (Governmental Courier), 7 February 2005 (in Ukrainian). This is a special report to the Ukrainian National Ministry of History. The author provides a narrative historical account of the archaeological explorations of the Verteba Cave and the village of Bilche-Zolote, with details about recent and projected improvements in the area to support potential tourist interest.
Більче Золоте історія (Bilche-Zolote history) from: Архітехтурні Та Природні Пам'ятки України (Architecture and Natural Monuments of Ukraine), providing a brief historical narrative of the town, with photos of some of the older buildings (in Ukrainian).
Більче-Золоте сайту (Bilche Zolote page) from: Верховна Рада України-Офіцйний Веб-Сайт-Органи Місцевого Самоврядування В Украіні (Parliament of Ukraine-Official Web Site-Local Government in Ukraine), providing data for the town of Bilche-Zolote (in Ukrainian)
The Verteba Cave, Borschiv district, Khmelnytski region, near Bilche-Zolote, Ukraine This web site has photographs of the entrance to the cave, as well as Cucuteni-Trypillian pottery partially buried in the cave's floor.
На Тернопільщині тривають дослідження найбільших у світі гіпсових печер A web site in Ukraine called: In Ternopil ongoing research the world's largest gypsum caves. This site includes some photographs of the Verteba cave and archaeological artifacts discovered at Bilche-Zolote.
Off the Face of the Earth: The remarkable story of a group of Holocaust survivors who hid in one of the world's largest caves A web page written by Peter Lane Taylor, one of the co-authors of the book "The secret of Priest's Grotto", which contains some excerpts from the book.
The Secret of Priest’s Grotto by Chris Nicola and Peter Lane Taylor An audio clip podcast of a 2007 interview with Chris Nicola and his co-author Peter Lane Taylor about the story of the Jewish survivors who hid in the Verteba and Priest's Grotto caves.
The Cave - the Secret of Priest's Grotto YouTube clip of a promotional teaser for a documentary about the Jewish survivors who hid in the Priest's Grotto and Verteba Caves during World War II. Some of the people who experienced this are interviewed briefly in this clip.

Villages in Ternopil Raion
Archaeological sites in Ukraine
Cucuteni–Trypillia culture
The Holocaust in Ukraine
Holocaust locations in Ukraine